Group Captain Virendera Singh Pathania was an Indian Air Force (IAF) fighter pilot reputed for making the first confirmed aerial dogfight kill of independent India when he shot down a Pakistan Air Force (PAF) Sabre Jet with his Folland Gnat on 4 September, 1965. For this action, he was awarded the Vir Chakra. 

On 14 December, 1971, he was awarded the Vayu Sena Medal for his role as a commander. While working under him, twenty-six-year-old flying officer PVC Nirmal Jit Singh Sekhon single-handedly engaged with six Sabre Jets. Pathania made another unconfirmed kill on 16 December, 1971, the day Gen. Niazi, Commander of the Eastern Command of the Pakistan Army surrendered to Gen. Aurora in Bangladesh.

Biography
During the Sino-Indian War, the IAF was only involved in a supportive capacity. Flight Lieutenant Virendera Singh Pathania of No. 23 Squadron IAF made sorties on the perforated steel-plated Chushul airport for photo-reconnaissance.

Indo-Pakistani Air War of 1965 began on 1st September 1965 after PAF dominated the skies with their F-86 and F-104 and making 4 kills of IAF Hunter planes on the very first day. However their supremacy was overshadowed when on 3rd September 1965 a Sabre was hit and a Starfigher had to leave the skies after it was attacked by Pathania who said on his radio "We shall meet again". Air Marshal Arjun Singh on that day remarked on that day's event that tyranny of PAF is over and 'Sabre slayers' were born leading Pakistani intelligence to hurriedly label Gnats as most dangerous.
Amar Jit Singh Sandhu, Johnny  Greene, Trevor Keelor, Virendera Singh Pathania became Sabre Slayers and were awarded Vir Chakras. 

During the Indo-Pakistani War of 1965, he was awarded the Vir Chakra for shooting down F-86 with his Folland Gnat jet on 4 September.  Pakistani officer N.M Butt of F-86 PAF ejected safely and the wreckage of Sabre Jet was recovered near Akhnoor Bridge in Jammu and Kashmir. IAF declared  it as the second kill of independent India.  However PAF recognizes 4th September 1965 as first kill by Pathania after it disputed the 3rd September  kill of Trevor Keelor for which Pakistan claims that damaged F-86 managed to land safely at Sargodha air base and awarded Sitara-e-Jurat to Wing Commander then Flight Lieutenant Yusuf Ali Khan who later made 1 kill in the war. 

On 6 December of the Indo-Pakistani War of 1971,  Squadron Leader Pathania of No. 18 Squadron IAF and Flying Officer Boppayya scrambled an incoming raid by four F-86 aircraft by intercepting their course in Srinagar.

On 14 December, 1971, he was awarded the Vayu Sena Medal for his commanding lead of Air Traffic Control (ATC) while Flying Officer Nirmal Jit Singh Sekhon PVC single-handedly engaged in a suicidal dogfight with six F-86 Sabre Jet Pakistani airplanes in Srinagar while deterring attackers from their prime targets. 

Two days later, on 16 December, 1971, Pathania avenged the death of Flying Officer Nirmal Jit Singh Sekhon by making an unconfirmed kill of an F-86 on the day of Pakistan Army's Eastern Command's surrender, marking it as last and lone kill entry by Gnat in List of aerial victories during the Indo-Pakistani War of 1971.

References

1937 births
1995 deaths
Pilots of the Indo-Pakistani War of 1965
Pilots of the Indo-Pakistani War of 1971
Indian aviation record holders
 Recipients of the Vir Chakra
 Recipients of the Vayu Sena Medal
 Indian Air Force officers
Indian military personnel of the Indo-Pakistani War of 1971
People from Kangra district
Military personnel from Himachal Pradesh